Kilgetty railway station serves Kilgetty in Pembrokeshire, Wales.

The station is a request stop so passengers wishing to alight should make their intentions known to the on-board train staff at the start of their journey, while passengers wishing to board should make a clear signal to the driver as the train approaches.

Services
Services at Kilgetty are provided by Transport for Wales which run at approximately 2-hour intervals in both directions. Great Western Railway also run a Summer Saturday only service that calls once a day.

External links 

Railway stations in Pembrokeshire
DfT Category F2 stations
Former Great Western Railway stations
Railway stations in Great Britain opened in 1866
Railway stations served by Great Western Railway
Railway stations served by Transport for Wales Rail
Railway request stops in Great Britain
1866 establishments in Wales